= Utekhol =

- Census town
- Location in Maharashtra, India
- Coordinates: 18.2498°N 73.2922°E
- Country: India
- State: Maharashtra
- District: Raigad

Population (2001)
  - Total: 7,286

Languages
  - Official: Marathi
- Time zone: UTC+5:30 (IST)

Utekhol is a census town in Raigad district in the Indian state of Maharashtra.

== Demographics ==
As of 2001 India census, Utekhol had a population of 7286. Males constitute 51% of the population and females 49%. Utekhol has an average literacy rate of 74%, higher than the national average of 59.5%: male literacy is 79%, and female literacy is 69%. In Utekhol, 14% of the population is under 6 years of age.
